Strela is a beer that is produced by the company CERIS, based in the eastern part of Praia, Cape Verde. The name Strela is Cape Verdean Creole for "star". Production of the beer was started in November 2006, replacing the production of Coral, a brand of CERIS's former owner Madeira Brewery. The beer is distributed by Cavibel. Both CERIS and Cavibel are owned by Equatorial Coca-Cola Bottling Company. Strela beer is exported to Gambia, Guinea and Portugal.

In 2016, Strela beer received a Superior Taste Award from the International Taste & Quality Institute (iTQi) in Brussels. In 2009, Strela was the second most consumed beer in Cape Verde, covering 35% of the market.

References

External links
Official website

Food and drink in Cape Verde
Drugs in Cape Verde
Beer in Africa
Beer brands